Swan neck may refer to:

Objects
Swan neck, a curved spout for dispensing beer
Swan neck duct, an air duct with a large change in mean radius
Swan-neck bottle, a type of ornamental glass bottle made in Iran
Swan neck flask, laboratory glassware designed to slow down the motion of air
Swan-necked pediment, a variation of an architectural element
Swan neck spur, a style of equestrian riding boot spur
Swan-neck tow ball, a type of trailer tow ball

People
Edith Swan-neck, the first wife or mistress of King Harold II of England

Conditions
Swan neck deformity, a deformity of the human finger